Binary is a techno-thriller novel written by Michael Crichton, his eleventh published novel, in 1972, the eighth and final time the pseudonym John Lange was featured. Crichton also directed Pursuit, a television film version. The story of both the book and the film revolve around a deadly nerve agent composed by combining two different chemicals. Hard Case Crime republished the novel under Crichton's name in 2013.

Plot summary 
State Department agent John Graves is investigating far-left businessman John Wright who has been acting suspiciously – he has masterminded the theft of several canisters of VZ nerve gas, a binary agent, and has enough of both canister types to kill nearly a million people, but the Agency is unsure of his motives.

During his investigation Graves establishes that Wright has acquired many other purchases; plastic explosives, large containers made of an exotic flammable material, seemingly of plumbing and pressure related nature – and also rented a small 19th floor apartment in San Diego where the President of the United States is due to meet for the imminent Republican Party convention, and deduces that Wright intends to assassinate the President.

Graves' task is made harder by inter-departmental interference, a lack of support from his manager Phelps, and that Wright has stolen a copy of Graves' State Department psychological profile, and seems to be depending on Graves behaving according to his profile.

Wright correctly predicts Graves' actions, and ultimately allows himself to be captured in order to distract Graves from continuing his investigation – only to successfully escape moments later, again predicting Graves' behaviour during the interrogation.  However prior to the interrogation Graves had decided against roadblocks surrounding the apartment, but realised that this was playing true to his profile, and changed his mind – Wright is subsequently killed trying to break through the unexpected blockade.

Observing the apartment through binoculars the two large canisters of the VZ nerve agent are seen, with plumbing attachments in order to correctly mix and disperse the two components.  Also observed is a remote timing detonator, and several booby traps.  Seeing that the remote detonator is attached to mains electricity, the police cut off the supply, only for a battery backup to take over, and a small gas release is seen resulting in the death of two police officers stationed outside the apartment.  The apartment is engulfed in VZ gas and inaccessible.

Although there is no cure for VZ, Nordmann – a forensic scientist attached to the case – reasons that there are other chemicals that can stave off the effects of VZ, possibly long enough for Graves to enter the apartment, nullify the remote detonator and leave again.  Graves takes the chemicals, noting with irony that they may also kill him, and enters the apartment.  Once inside he finds that the booby traps are a sham, and the only danger is from the VZ gas itself which he vents through a window – being on the 19th floor the gas dissipates harmlessly into the unoccupied street below.  Moments after he disconnects the pipes from the tanks the timer activates and click open – but being disconnected no gas is created, and Graves leaves the apartment pensive, thinking that the victory has been too easily achieved.  To support this theory he discusses his psychological profile with Nordmann & Phelps, stressing that his key psyche flaw is that he considers tasks complete when in reality they are often only partially finished.

Phelps is dismissive, but Nordmann supports Graves' theory, and he is partially vindicated when a booby trap disables the lifts, trapping everybody on the 19th floor – but the booby trap was timed to go off after the venting was complete.  Graves takes this to mean that Wright knew he might disarm the tanks, and so had a backup plan.  He recalls the flammable nature of the tanks, and the missing plastic explosive, reasoning that Wright had intended the tanks to explode after being emptied – thus destroying any lingering evidence.  Panicking, he realises that if the still-full tanks explode in the same room, enough of the two agents would still combine to kill thousands, and that this is Wright's backup plan.  One tank is frantically manhandled out of the open venting window and it explodes as it falls to the street.  The other tank explodes in the hallway of the apartment block.  The two binary chemicals are harmless by themselves, and nobody is injured by either the liquid chemicals or the explosions.

In an aftermath Graves observes that in order to prevent public panic the incident is hushed up, being only referred to as a chemical theft "halted by intervention of the Defense Department, with some minor assistance by State Department personnel, particularly Mr. R. Phelps" and that although official departmental changes are recommended to prevent any further thefts, nothing is actually mandated and no policy changes are made.

Reception
The Guardian said it had a "dotty, old-hat plot made unexpectedly credible with new gadgetry and well-engineered surprises". The New York Times wrote "the author maintains tension ably".

Film adaptation

Pursuit was a 1972 made-for-TV movie that screened on the ABC network based on the novel. It was a TV Movie of the Week and marked Crichton's directorial debut.

References

1972 American novels
Novels by Michael Crichton
Techno-thriller novels
Alfred A. Knopf books
American novels adapted into films
American novels adapted into television shows
Works published under a pseudonym